The 1998 Scheldeprijs was the 85th edition of the Scheldeprijs cycle race and was held on 22 April 1998. The race was won by Servais Knaven of the TVM team.

General classification

References

1998
1998 in road cycling
1998 in Belgian sport
April 1998 sports events in Europe